is a fantasy action role-playing game franchise created by Japanese game designers Tetsuya Nomura and Shinji Hashimoto, being developed and published by Square Enix (originally by Square). It is a collaboration between Square Enix and The Walt Disney Company and is under the leadership of Nomura, a longtime Square Enix employee.

Kingdom Hearts is a crossover of various Disney properties based in an original fictional universe. The series centers on the main character, Sora, and his journey and experiences with various Disney and Pixar characters, as well as some from Square Enix properties, such as Final Fantasy, The World Ends With You and Einhänder, in addition to original characters and locations created specifically for the series. 

The series consists of thirteen games available for multiple platforms and future games are planned. Most of the games in the series have been positively received and commercially successful. As of March 2022, the Kingdom Hearts series has shipped more than 36 million copies worldwide. A wide variety of related merchandise has been released along with the games, including soundtracks, figurines, companion books, light novels, a collectible card game, and a manga series.

Media

Games 

 Kingdom Hearts is the first game in the series, released in Japan on March 28, 2002, for PlayStation 2. Tetsuya Nomura served as game director, his first time in this position. Kingdom Hearts introduced the main characters (Sora, Kairi, and Riku) of the series, and established the plot's framework involving hearts and dark beings known as the Heartless. It also established the role of Disney characters in the series, with character cameos from the Final Fantasy series. Kingdom Hearts was released in North America on September 17, 2002, and featured additional content that was not in the original Japanese version. The game was later re-released in Japan as Kingdom Hearts Final Mix on December 26, 2002. Final Mix includes the content from the North American release and additional enemies, cutscenes, and weapons.
 Kingdom Hearts: Chain of Memories is a direct sequel to the first game. It was released on the Game Boy Advance in Japan on November 11, 2004. Chain of Memories was touted as a bridge between the two PlayStation 2 games, introducing and previewing plot elements that would be explored in the next game. The gameplay system is a departure from the original and employs card game mechanics in real time. Players construct decks out of cards that correspond to different actions in battle, such as attacking or using magic. It was remade into a PlayStation 2 game titled Kingdom Hearts Re:Chain of Memories, which contains polygonal graphics instead of the sprites used in the original game. The remake was released in Japan as a second disc packaged with Kingdom Hearts II Final Mix on March 29, 2007, and in North America as a standalone game on December 2, 2008.
 Kingdom Hearts II takes place one year after the events of Chain of Memories. It was released for the PlayStation 2 in Japan on December 22, 2005. The game further explores the "heart" concept by involving a new group of enemies, the Nobodies, which are the cast-off shells of those who have become Heartless. The gameplay is similar to that of the first Kingdom Hearts game, with the addition of the Reaction Command, which performs reflex-sensitive actions in battle. Kingdom Hearts II was revised into Kingdom Hearts II Final Mix, which contains more material than the original release, such as additional cutscenes and bosses. Kingdom Hearts II Final Mix was released with Kingdom Hearts Re:Chain of Memories in a collection titled Kingdom Hearts II Final Mix+, which was released in Japan on March 29, 2007.
 Kingdom Hearts Coded is an episodic mobile phone game that picks up directly after Kingdom Hearts II. The "preinstall" episode was released in Japan on November 18, 2008, and eight episodes were released between June 3, 2009, and January 28, 2010. The game was remade for the Nintendo DS as Kingdom Hearts Re:coded, and features updated gameplay combining that of two later entries in the series, 358/2 Days and Birth by Sleep. Unlike the original version, Re:coded was released internationally: October 7, 2010 in Japan; January 11, 2011 in North America; and January 14, 2011, in Europe.
 Kingdom Hearts 358/2 Days was released for the Nintendo DS in Japan on May 30, 2009. It is primarily set between Kingdom Hearts and Kingdom Hearts II, focusing on Roxas' time in Organization XIII and his motives for leaving. It is the first game in the series to feature cooperative multiplayer in addition to the traditional use of AI-controlled partners. Gameplay is mission-based with optional objectives that yield additional rewards. The game also has a unique panel system which governs character improvement, special abilities, and equipped weapons.
 Kingdom Hearts Birth by Sleep is a prequel to the series, released for the PlayStation Portable in Japan on January 9, 2010, and in North America on September 7, 2010, with additional content. The game is set ten years before the events of the first Kingdom Hearts game, revealing the origins of the villain, Xehanort. It consists of four scenarios, three of which focus on one of the game's three protagonists, Terra, Ventus, and Aqua. The game was re-released in Japan under the title Kingdom Hearts Birth by Sleep Final Mix on January 20, 2011, with the content from the English versions as well as new features, such as an additional fifth scenario.
 Kingdom Hearts 3D: Dream Drop Distance was released on March 29, 2012, in Japan for the Nintendo 3DS. The game focuses on Sora and Riku's Mark of Mastery exam under Yen Sid in anticipation of Xehanort's return and their subsequent conflicts with enemies from their past. In addition to similar systems inherited from Birth by Sleep, this game features "Dream Eaters" which serve as both enemies and allies. Players may collect and breed friendly Dream Eaters and train them to become more powerful. The English edition came out on July 20, 2012, in Europe while it came out on July 31, 2012, for North America.
 Kingdom Hearts χ: At Tokyo Game Show 2012, Square Enix announced Kingdom Hearts χ, previously known as Kingdom Hearts for PC Browsers. It is a browser game for PCs, and is only playable in Japan since July 18, 2013. It features cartoon-like 2D models and is a prequel to the series, detailing the events leading up to the Keyblade War.
 Kingdom Hearts: Unchained χ: An international port of Kingdom Hearts χ that was released for Android and iOS devices. Unchained χ was released in Japan on September 3, 2015, in North America on April 7, 2016, and in Europe on June 16, 2016.  Later in April 2017, it was rebranded as Kingdom Hearts: Union χ, featuring an all-new story that expanded and diverged from the original. In January 2019, the game was available on the Amazon Appstore for Amazon devices. The app was rebranded once again to Kingdom Hearts: Union χ Dark Road with the release of Kingdom Hearts Dark Road. The game was shut down and converted into a cutscene viewer in May 2021.
 Kingdom Hearts Dark Road is a mobile game accessed within Kingdom Hearts Union χ[Cross], which released worldwide on June 22, 2020. The game is set 70 years before Birth by Sleep and explores the origins of Xehanort and his eventual turn to darkness, and was developed by the same team working on Union χ. Following the shutdown of Union χ, Dark Road was converted into an offline game and received its final story update in August 2022.
 Kingdom Hearts III: In September 2010, Tetsuya Nomura stated that his team was too busy with other projects such as Final Fantasy XV (known as Final Fantasy Versus XIII at the time) to work on Kingdom Hearts III. He also stated that his team was researching how to create the high-definition graphics of the game, which depended on the technical restrictions of the next generation consoles. On June 10, 2013, at the E3 Sony press conference, after years of rumors and speculations, Nomura introduced a teaser for Kingdom Hearts III, which stated it was in development for the PlayStation 4. It was announced the next day to be in development for the Xbox One as well. In Kingdom Hearts III, the series protagonist Sora embarks on a journey to regain his lost "Power of Waking" while Sora's friends, Riku and King Mickey, search for the Keyblade wielders Aqua, Terra, and Ventus in preparation for their final battle against Xehanort. The game concludes the "Dark Seeker Saga". The game was released on January 25, 2019, in Japan and on January 29 worldwide. A cloud version for the Nintendo Switch of the game plus the Re Mind DLC was released on February 10, 2022.
 Kingdom Hearts: Melody of Memory is a rhythm-based game for the Nintendo Switch, PlayStation 4, and Xbox One. It is the first Kingdom Hearts game to release on the Nintendo Switch, and was released in Japan on November 11, 2020, and worldwide on November 13. Featuring 140 songs, it sees players travel to each stage in a Gummi ship, and features gameplay similar to Theatrhythm Final Fantasy. Melody of Memory continues Kairi's story from the end of Kingdom Hearts III, with Nomura saying the Kingdom Hearts III Re Mind title screen laid "some of the groundwork for it".

Other 
 A Kingdom Hearts game was developed for V CAST, Verizon Wireless's broadband service, and was released on October 1, 2004, in Japan and on February 4, 2005, in the United States. It was one of the launch games for the V CAST services. The game, developed by Superscape and published by Disney Mobile with no involvement from Square Enix, features gameplay akin to the first Kingdom Hearts game, modified for the input method of mobile phones. The game's storyline features Sora struggling to free himself from a nightmare induced by Maleficent's magic.
 Kingdom Hearts Mobile was a Kingdom Hearts-themed social game in which players could play mini-games together. Unlike Kingdom Hearts for the V CAST and Kingdom Hearts Coded, this game does not have a storyline and focuses more on socializing. The service operated in conjunction with Kingdom Hearts Coded — new avatar costumes became available after the player completed an episode of Kingdom Hearts Coded. Kingdom Hearts-related media such as wallpapers, ringtones, graphics, and other items could be purchased and downloaded through the service for mobile phones.
 Kingdom Hearts VR Experience: Announced in September 2018, Kingdom Hearts VR Experience is a free, 10-minute interactive video "featuring iconic moments [and music] from the Kingdom Hearts games" with the ability to unlock additional content by progressing through the experience. The first part was released in Japan on January 23, 2019, with the second part releasing in early 2019. The first part had initially been scheduled to release on January 18, 2019, after initial release dates of December 25, 2018 for the first part, with the second part releasing on January 18, 2019.

Collections 
 Kingdom Hearts HD 1.5 Remix was released for the PlayStation 3 in Japan on March 14, 2013. The collection includes remastered versions of Kingdom Hearts Final Mix and Re:Chain of Memories, which include gameplay enhancements and trophy support. In addition, a "Theater Mode" has been added, consisting of high definition cutscenes from Kingdom Hearts 358/2 Days. The collection was released in North America on September 10, 2013 in Australia on September 12, 2013, and in Europe on September 13, 2013. A cloud version for the Nintendo Switch was released on February 10, 2022.
 Kingdom Hearts HD 2.5 Remix: After the announcement of HD 1.5 Remix, Nomura stated that it would be "pretty unnatural" if Kingdom Hearts II did not receive an HD update. In the credits of HD 1.5 Remix, clips of Kingdom Hearts II Final Mix, Kingdom Hearts Birth by Sleep Final Mix, and Kingdom Hearts Re:coded were shown, hinting at another collection. On October 14, 2013, the collection was announced for the PlayStation 3, and included the previously mentioned games, with Re:coded appearing as HD cinematics, similar to 358/2 Days in HD 1.5 Remix. The collection was released in Japan on October 2, 2014, North America on December 2, 2014, Australia on December 4, 2014, and Europe on December 5, 2014. A cloud version for the Nintendo Switch was released on February 10, 2022.
 Kingdom Hearts HD 2.8 Final Chapter Prologue: In the credits of HD 2.5 Remix, clips of Kingdom Hearts 3D: Dream Drop Distance were shown as well as the inclusion of a secret ending related to the game, hinting at a possible additional collection. In September 2015, Square Enix announced Kingdom Hearts HD 2.8 Final Chapter Prologue. The collection features an HD remaster of Dream Drop Distance as well as Kingdom Hearts χ Back Cover, a cinematic telling of the backstory behind the events of Kingdom Hearts χ, and Kingdom Hearts 0.2: Birth by Sleep – A Fragmentary Passage, a new game taking place after the events of the original Birth by Sleep, told from the perspective of Aqua. It was released in Japan on January 12, 2017, and in North America and Europe on January 24, 2017, with a later release on February 18, 2020, for the Xbox One. A cloud version for the Nintendo Switch was released on February 10, 2022.
 The following are repackaged versions of the above collections:
 Kingdom Hearts Starter Pack: HD 1.5 + 2.5 Remix: A collector's pack released in Japan includes Kingdom Hearts HD 1.5 Remix and Kingdom Hearts HD 2.5 Remix.
 Kingdom Hearts Collector's Pack: HD 1.5 + 2.5 Remix: A collector's pack released in Japan includes Kingdom Hearts HD 1.5 Remix and Kingdom Hearts HD 2.5 Remix, a code to get an Anniversary Set for Kingdom Hearts χ, music, and a booklet with art from the series.
 Kingdom Hearts HD 1.5 + 2.5 Remix: In October 2016, Square-Enix announced a single-disc compilation release of Kingdom Hearts HD 1.5 Remix and Kingdom Hearts HD 2.5 Remix for the PlayStation 4. The compilation was released on March 9, 2017, in Japan; March 28, 2017 in North America; and March 31, 2017, in Europe. It was later released on February 18, 2020, for the Xbox One. A cloud version for the Nintendo Switch was released on February 10, 2022.
 Kingdom Hearts: The Story So Far: Announced in early October 2018, this bundle collects the Kingdom Hearts HD 1.5 + 2.5 Remix PlayStation 4 collection and Kingdom Hearts HD 2.8 Final Chapter Prologue. It was released in North America on October 30, 2018, for the PlayStation 4.
 Kingdom Hearts: All-In-One-Package: This bundle contains everything in The Story So Far, along with Kingdom Hearts III. It was released digitally on the PlayStation 4 in North America on January 29, 2019. The bundle became available physically in North America on March 17, 2020.
 Kingdom Hearts Integrum Masterpiece for Cloud: This bundle contains cloud versions of Kingdom Hearts HD 1.5 + 2.5 Remix, Kingdom Hearts HD 2.8 Final Chapter Prologue, and Kingdom Hearts III + Re Mind for the Nintendo Switch which was released on February 10, 2022.

Future 
 Kingdom Hearts Missing-Link: In April 2022, Square Enix revealed Kingdom Hearts Missing-Link was in development for iOS and Android devices. It is set in Scala ad Caelum between the events of Union X and Dark Road. A closed beta was released in Winter 2022.
 Kingdom Hearts IV: Though Kingdom Hearts III was the end of the "Dark Seeker Saga" which revolved around Xehanort, it had been decided where certain characters end up in order to potentially continue their stories in future games. In January 2020, Nomura said there would need to be "more time" before the next main entry in the series, later noting in September that Yozora would "definitely... be involved" in the future of the series, in an unexpected and surprising way. In April 2022, Square Enix revealed Kingdom Hearts IV was in development, confirmed that Sora, Donald, and Goofy would return, and that the game would be set in Quadratum, a realistic world inspired by Tokyo. Kingdom Hearts IV will be the start of the "Lost Master arc".

Common elements

Disney and Square Enix characters 

Kingdom Hearts features a mixture of familiar Disney and Square Enix characters, as well as several new characters designed and created by Nomura. In addition to original locations, the Kingdom Hearts series features many worlds from Disney films. Sora must visit these worlds and interact with various Disney characters to protect them from enemies. Often, his actions in these worlds closely follow the storylines of their respective Disney films. The main characters try not to interfere with the affairs of other worlds, as it could negatively affect the universe's order. Various Final Fantasy characters also make appearances within several worlds throughout the series. This includes Moogles, small creatures who are another common element in the games. They provide the player with a synthesis shop in order to create and purchase items used in the game. The main cast from The World Ends with You also makes an appearance in the series in Dream Drop Distance, and Kingdom Hearts III features characters from Pixar films such as the Toy Story series and Monsters, Inc., as well as Schwarzgeist, one of the bosses from Einhänder. Nevertheless, the usage of Disney characters is not without restrictions. For example, Nomura had requested the use of Oswald the Lucky Rabbit in Kingdom Hearts III, but the response from Disney was that the character would be "too difficult" to use, with no further clarification or details from Disney.

Story 

The series starts with Kingdom Hearts, where a 14-year-old boy named Sora is separated from his friends Riku and Kairi when their home Destiny Islands is consumed in darkness. At that moment Sora obtained a weapon called the Keyblade that allows him to fight the Heartless, creatures that originate from the Realm of Darkness, before ending up in another world, Traverse Town, where he meets Donald Duck and Goofy, two emissaries from Disney Castle sent to find the Keyblade wielder under orders from their missing king, Mickey Mouse. As the three band together and travel to save various worlds from the Heartless while searching for their companions, they encounter a group of Disney villains whose ability to control the Heartless was given to them by Maleficent, who enlists Riku's aid in seeking seven maidens called the Princesses of Heart whose power would open the way to Kingdom Hearts, the heart of all worlds. Though eventually defeating Maleficent and reunited with Kairi after sacrificing himself to restore her heart to her body, Sora learns that Maleficent was manipulated by a sentient Heartless who possesses Riku and claims himself to be the Heartless researcher Ansem. Though Sora defeats Ansem, he is forced to trap Riku and Mickey in the Realm of Darkness after sealing the door and resolute to find them while Kairi remains at the Destiny Islands for their return.

In Kingdom Hearts: Chain of Memories, Sora's search for Riku and Mickey leads his group to Castle Oblivion, a fortress controlled by a mysterious group of non-existent "Nobodies" called Organization XIII, the castle's overseer Marluxia using the power of a girl named Naminé to alter the group's memories for his agenda. After Marluxia's defeat, the three are placed in a year-long sleep by Naminé to restore their original memories while losing their experience in Castle Oblivion. At the same time Sora ventured through Castle Oblivion, Riku ended up in the basement levels and ascends to the ground floor with Mickey's aid while dealing with a Replica of himself that fought Sora. Finding the comatose Sora while joining forces with the mysterious DiZ, Riku helps Naminé keep his friend safe until he is awoken. In Kingdom Hearts 358/2 Days, a snag in the plan over the year forces Riku to capture Roxas—Sora's Nobody and Organization XIII member that came into being when Sora briefly became a Heartless in the first game-after he was forced to defeat and absorb Xion, a Replica of Sora in Kairi's image.

In Kingdom Hearts II, after Roxas was integrated back into him, an awakened Sora and his friends resume their search for Riku and King Mickey, the latter's mentor Yen Sid re-familiarizing the trio with the Nobodies and Organization XIII's remaining members whom they deal alongside Maleficent and her right hand Pete. The three reunite with King Mickey and encounter Organization XIII's leader Xemnas, him and the Heartless Ansem revealed to the splintered halves of the real Ansem's apprentice Xehanort. The Organization's plan is also revealed: regaining their lost hearts by using Keyblade users to create an artificial Kingdom Hearts from slain Emblem Heartless. Axel, a rogue Organization member who is Roxas' friend and first encountered Sora in Castle Oblivion, abducts Kairi in an attempt to see Roxas. Axel's action only give Saix, his former friend and Xemnas' enforcer, leverage to force Sora into finishing what Roxas and Xion began. Axel sacrifices himself to help Sora's group reach The World That Never Was (Organization XIII's headquarters) and, after defeating Xemnas's right hand Xigbar, reunite with Riku and Kairi. DiZ, revealed to be the real Ansem, attempts dissipating some of the artificial Kingdom Hearts before being engulfed in an explosion when his extraction device self-destructs and is sent to the Realm of Darkness. Sora and his friends then battle Xemnas. After Sora and Riku defeat Xemnas, they get trapped in the Realm of Darkness, but a letter from Kairi summons a gateway for them, and the two are reunited with their friends at their home. Sometime after his first adventure in Disney Castle, Sora discovered a portal at Disney Castle, and ventured through it to find a mysterious armour referred to as 'Lingering Will'. During their exchange, it mistook Sora for Xehanort, after which Sora fought the mysterious armour. Sora won the battle, and the Lingering Will merely knelt down after this, saying that he once felt the power Sora possessed.

Sometime later after the events of the game, Sora, Riku, and Kairi receive a letter from King Mickey. The letter, written by Mickey during the events of Kingdom Hearts Coded, describes the parts of their past that Naminé learned while restoring Sora's memory. As they read the letter, they learn of Xehanort's true identity as a Keyblade Master who sought the secrets of the Keyblade War which created their current reality and the fates that befall the apprentices of his friend Eraqus during the events of Kingdom Hearts Birth by Sleep: Terra having ended up possessed by Xehanort and made into the original being that Xehanort's Heartless and Xemnas were split from; Ventus sacrificing his heart by fighting his dark counterpart Vanitas, while trying to prevent Xehanort from recreating the legendary χ-blade which allows the user to control Kingdom Hearts, and hiding within four-year-old Sora's heart; and new Keyblade Master Aqua trapped within the Realm of Darkness while an amnesic Xehanort ended up Ansem's apprentice alongside his accomplice Braig (Xigbar's original self). King Mickey also discovers that the destruction of "Ansem" and Xemnas has led to Xehanort's restoration. To combat the new threat Xehanort poses, Sora and Riku take an exam to attain the Mark of Mastery that will allow them to become Keyblade Masters themselves.

During the test in Kingdom Hearts 3D: Dream Drop Distance, Sora and Riku enter the Realm of Sleep where they encounter a young version of Xehanort who can travel through time. The two Keyblade wielders also learn how Xehanort has long manipulated events since Birth by Sleep with Organization XIII's true purpose in providing thirteens vessels for him to inhabit and use against seven hearts of pure light in an ultimate battle to recreate the χ-blade. But Sora's interference forced Xehanort to retrieve his alternate selves, Marluxia, Larxene, Demyx, Luxord, Vanitas, and Xion from across time in Replica bodies to form his ideal Organization XIII with Xigbar, Saix, and Vexen. Sora is narrowly saved from being Xehanort's final vessel with the aid of Lea (Axel's original self) and Riku learns about data that Ansem the Wise had implanted within Sora during his year-long sleep, which may be used to save those connected to Sora. At the end of the exam, Riku is declared a Keyblade Master; in Kingdom Hearts HD 2.8 Final Chapter Prologue, Sora embarks on another journey to regain his "Power of Waking" while Riku helps Mickey find Aqua, Yen Sid training Kairi and Lea so they can help in the final battle against Xehanort and keep him from the Princesses of Heart.

In Kingdom Hearts III, Sora regains his "Power of Waking" in his group's travels while Riku and Mickey retrace Aqua's steps to find her and Terra. Sora later discovers Eraqus's Keyblade on the beach and uses it to open a door to the Realm of Darkness, finding Aqua who has been consumed by darkness after Ansem was abducted by Xehanort's Heartless. Once Aqua is purified by Sora and Riku, she leads them to Castle Oblivion which she restores to its true form as the Land of Departure to revive Ventus despite Vanitas' interference. The group are joined by Kairi and Lea as they face Xehanort and his followers, with a Riku Replica completing the group, at the Keyblade Graveyard. After initially losing the fight, Sora once again uses the "Power of Waking" to restore the guardians and call upon the "Lingering Will" armour, to assist in the fight. Afterwards it is revealed that Saix and Vexen sabotaged the Organization's plan by restoring Roxas as Sora's group manage to defeat all of Xehanort's remaining selves while freeing Xion and Terra from his control. Xehanort kills Kairi to force Sora to manifest the χ-blade, revealing his true plan is to use the true Kingdom Hearts to wipe the slate on reality clean before finally being defeated. Xehanort departs with Eraqus's spirit into the light as Sora closes Kingdom Hearts. Sora also sacrifices himself by using the "Power of Waking" once more to revive Kairi. Sometime later, all the guardians, including their close friends and allies, celebrate victory at Destiny Islands. Xigbar, revealed to be the current incarnation of the ancient Keyblade Master Luxu from the time of the Keyblade War, summons the Foretellers, his fellow Keyblade Masters, to the present for the next phase of his mission. A year later, all attempts to find a clue to Sora's current whereabouts have proven to be futile until Riku and Kairi, with the help of the Fairy Godmother, find clues that lead them to believe that Sora has been transported outside of their reality. Riku embarks on a search for him after opening a portal to another reality in the Final World. Elsewhere, Sora meets Yozora, a supposedly fictional character from a video game. During their exchange Yozora claims that he is tasked to "save Sora" and the world is transported into Shibuya. Sora is challenged to a fight by Yozora, whom he defeats. Yozora fades away as Sora returns to The Final World. Both Sora and Yozora wonder if their meeting was real, with neither character making sense of it.

Gameplay 
The Kingdom Hearts games contain elements of action role-playing video games with hack-and-slash elements. The games are driven by a linear progression from one story event to the next, usually shown in the form of a cutscene, though there are numerous side quests available that provide bonus benefits to the characters. In most games, the player primarily controls the principal protagonist of the series, Sora. Sora is usually accompanied by Donald Duck and Goofy, who are artificial intelligence-controlled non-playable characters that aid Sora in battle. In the first and third game, their behavior can be altered to suit different combat objectives. The games feature real-time combat that incorporates physical attacks, magic, and summonings, though each game handles battles differently. The game also allows for items to be used on the field of battle to heal oneself or one's party members.

Gummi Ships are another common element of the series, which serve as the main mode of transportation between worlds in the games. The gameplay for the Gummi Ship sections is more akin to a rail shooter. Because it received negative criticism in the first game, it was modified in the third game. Most games also feature a journal which is accessible from the main menu. This journal keeps track of information regarding the story, characters, enemies, and locations. In Kingdom Hearts, Chain of Memories, Kingdom Hearts II, and Kingdom Hearts III, the journal is kept by Jiminy Cricket, who was appointed by Queen Minnie as the royal chronicler. In 358/2 Days, Birth by Sleep, and Dream Drop Distance, the main characters write their own journal entries.

The games are influenced by their parent franchise, Final Fantasy, and carry its gameplay elements over into their own action-based, hack-and-slash system. Like many traditional role-playing games, Kingdom Hearts features an experience point system which determines character development. As enemies are defeated, the player gains experience which culminates in a "level-up", where the characters grow stronger and gain access to new abilities. The amount of experience is shared with all party members and each character grows stronger as experience is gained.

Music 

The music for the series has been primarily composed by Yoko Shimomura. Kaoru Wada works as the arranger for orchestral music, including orchestral renditions of the main vocal themes and the ending themes. The orchestral music was performed by the New Japan Philharmonic Orchestra and the Tokyo Philharmonic Orchestra. Soundtracks were released for the first and third installments following the release of their respective games. A compilation soundtrack was later released that included soundtracks for the entire series, including reworked tracks for the re-released Kingdom Hearts Re:Chain of Memories.

While the themes for some of the Disney-based worlds are taken directly from their Disney film counterparts, most of them are given entirely original musical scores. In addition to each world having unique background music, each is given its own battle theme rather than having a common theme to cover all fights. Several of the main characters have themes, and the final boss of each game has several themes played in the various phases of those fights. The fights with Sephiroth feature a modified version of Nobuo Uematsu's "One-Winged Angel" from Final Fantasy VII.

The main theme songs for the Kingdom Hearts games were written and performed by Japanese pop star, Hikaru Utada. The three main themes are "Hikari", originally from Kingdom Hearts, "Passion", from Kingdom Hearts II, and "Oath" from Kingdom Hearts III. Each song has an English counterpart, "Simple and Clean", "Sanctuary", and "Don't Think Twice" respectively, for the North American and European releases. Utada was the only singer Tetsuya Nomura had in mind for the first Kingdom Hearts theme song. This marked the first time Utada had produced a song for a video game. Both of the first two theme songs reached notable popularity; on weekly Oricon charts, "Hikari" reached No. 1 in 2002 and "Passion" reached No. 4 in 2005.

Development and history

History 
The initial idea for Kingdom Hearts began with a discussion between Shinji Hashimoto and Hironobu Sakaguchi about Super Mario 64. They were planning to make a game with freedom of movement in three dimensions like Super Mario 64 but lamented that only characters as popular as Disney's could rival a Mario game. Tetsuya Nomura, overhearing their conversation, volunteered to lead the project and the two producers agreed to let him direct. A chance meeting between Hashimoto and a Disney executive in an elevator (Square and Disney had previously worked in the same building in Japan) allowed Hashimoto to pitch the idea directly to Disney. Development began in February 2000 with Nomura as director and Hashimoto as producer. While Nomura had done previous work in the Final Fantasy series as monster designer and graphic director, he did not gain widespread recognition until he was the lead character designer for Final Fantasy VII. Kingdom Hearts marked his transition into a directorial position, though he also served as the game's character designer. Scenarios were provided by Kazushige Nojima who was a scenario writer for Square from Final Fantasy VII until he left in 2003. Originally the development focused on the gameplay with a simple story to appeal to Disney's target age range. After Kingdom Hearts executive producer Hironobu Sakaguchi told Nomura the game would be a failure if it did not aim for the same level as the Final Fantasy series, he began to develop the story further. In June 2013, Nomura stated the name of the game came from him thinking about Disney Theme Parks, especially Animal Kingdom. However, Nomura could not get the IP with just "Kingdom", so the development team began to think about "heart" as a core part of the story, so they decided to combine the two to form "Kingdom Hearts".

Nomura placed a secret trailer in Kingdom Hearts in hopes that fans would want a sequel. He was unsure if fans would want a sequel and felt that if they did not, then it would be best to leave certain events in the first game unexplained. After Kingdom Hearts Final Mix was completed, development for Kingdom Hearts II began. There were several obstacles to clear before development could begin on a sequel. One was the development team's desire to showcase Mickey Mouse more; Mickey's inclusion in the first game was restricted to a very small role. Nomura had planned for the sequel to take place a year after the first and originally intended for the events of that year to be left unexplained. To bridge the gap between the two games, Kingdom Hearts: Chain of Memories was developed. Nomura was hesitant about releasing a game on the Game Boy Advance because he felt the 3D graphics of the original game would not translate well into 2D. He changed his position after hearing that children wanted to play Kingdom Hearts on the handheld system.

Creation and design 
Though Disney gave Nomura freedom in the characters and worlds used for the games, he and his staff tried to stay within the established roles of characters and boundaries of the worlds. Nomura has stated that though many of the Disney characters are not normally dark and serious, there were not many challenges making them so for the story and despite this, their personalities shine because they maintain their own characteristics. He also felt managing and keeping multiple worlds was problematic. When deciding which worlds to include in the game, the development staff tried to take into account worlds with Disney characters that would be interesting and made an effort to minimize any overlap in the overall look and feel of each world.

The inclusion of specific Final Fantasy characters was based on the opinions of both fans and staff. Another criterion for inclusion was whether the staff felt the characters would fit into the storyline and in the Kingdom Hearts universe. Initially, Nomura was hesitant to use characters he did not design, because he was unfamiliar with the backstory of such characters. For Kingdom Hearts II, he changed his mind after receiving pressure from his staff. Throughout the development of the games, Nomura has often left certain events and connections between characters unexplained until the release of future games. Nomura does this because he feels that games should have room for fans to speculate and use their imagination. He has stated that with speculation, even though a game gets old, people can still be happy with it.

Promotion 
The first Kingdom Hearts was announced at E3 in May 2001. Initial details were that it would be a collaboration between Square and Disney Interactive, and would feature worlds developed by both companies and Disney characters. New characters were designed by Nomura and include Sora, Riku, Kairi, and the Heartless. On May 14, 2002, a press release announced a list of the English voice actors. The list included Haley Joel Osment, David Gallagher, and Hayden Panettiere as the three new characters introduced into the game. It was also announced that many of the Disney characters would be voiced by the official voice actors from their respective Disney films.

A secret trailer in the first Kingdom Hearts and Kingdom Hearts Final Mix hinted at the possibility of a sequel. Rumors for a sequel on the PlayStation 2 were spurred in Japan when a Japanese video game site, Quiter, stated that "an internal (and anonymous) source at Square Japan" confirmed that development of Kingdom Hearts II had begun. It was not until Kingdom Hearts II was announced, along with Kingdom Hearts: Chain of Memories, at the Tokyo Game Show in September 2003 that rumors were confirmed. Initial details were that it would take place some time after Kingdom Hearts: Chain of Memories, which takes place directly after the first game. Other details included the return of Sora, Donald, and Goofy, as well as new costumes. At the 2004 Square Enix E3 press conference, the producer, Shinji Hashimoto, stated that many mysteries of the first game would be answered.

To help market the games, websites were set up for each game and demos were on display at gaming events. Each game in the main series was also re-released in Japan with additional content and served as canonical updates to the series. The additional content foreshadowed later plot elements in the series. The rereleases of the main series games had the term "Final Mix" added after the title, while Kingdom Hearts: Chain of Memories and Kingdom Hearts Coded were re-released as Kingdom Hearts Re:Chain of Memories and Kingdom Hearts Re:coded and released on the PlayStation 2 and Nintendo DS, respectively, with 3D graphics, voice overs during some cutscenes, and new game content.

Reception 

The Kingdom Hearts series has been critically and commercially successful. As of March 2014, the series has sold over 20 million copies worldwide. The three main games in the series all met with positive sales at the time of their releases. In the first two months since the North American release of Kingdom Hearts, it was one of the top three highest-selling video games. Chain of Memories sold 104,000 units in 48 hours in Japan, a record for a Game Boy Advance game at the time. Its positive debut sales placed it in the top spot of sales charts in Japan. In the first month of its North American release, it was ranked 1st on GameSpot's ChartSpot for portable systems and 6th for all consoles. Within three days of the Kingdom Hearts II release in Japan, it shipped 1 million copies, selling through within a month. By the end of March 2006, the NPD Group reported that Kingdom Hearts II was the highest-selling console game in North America, with 614,000 copies. In the month after its release in North America, Kingdom Hearts II sold an estimated 1 million copies. As of February 2019, the Kingdom Hearts series has shipped more than 30 million copies worldwide. This number reached to over 35 million copies shipped by October 2021. On April 11, 2022, Kingdom Hearts III was revealed to reach a total of 6.7 million units as of September 2021 surpassing Kingdom Hearts 6 million units to become the current best selling title in the series. As of March 2022, the Kingdom Hearts series has shipped more than 36 million copies worldwide.

The games have also received high ratings and positive comments from reviewers. All of the main games in the series have scored a 36 out of 40 or higher from the Japanese gaming magazine Famitsu, known for its harsh grading. All six games have been praised for their visuals. Game Informer considers the series the eleventh "must-play PlayStation 2" series. The individual games have also won several awards. GameSpot commented that the concept of mixing the serious elements of Final Fantasy with the lighter elements of Disney seemed impossible, but was pulled off quite well. Because of that they awarded Kingdom Hearts "Best Crossover Since Capcom vs. SNK" in their 2002 Best and Worst of the Year awards. IGN named Kingdom Hearts "Best Art Style/Direction" in their 2003 list of "Best Looking Games on PS2". G4 awarded it "Best Story" at their 2003 G-Phoria awards show. Electronic Gaming Monthly awarded Kingdom Hearts II "Best Sequel" of 2006. It tied with Resident Evil 4 as Famitsu's Game of the Year 2005. The manga series has also been well received. Several of the manga volumes were listed on USA Todays "Top 150 best sellers". The highest ranked volume was Kingdom Hearts volume 4 at #73. Every volume listed stayed on the list for at least two weeks; Kingdom Hearts volume 4 stayed the longest at four weeks.

Other media 
Both Square Enix and Disney have released a wide variety of Kingdom Hearts merchandise including toys, figurines, clothing, and jewelry. Two of the games, Kingdom Hearts and Kingdom Hearts II, had a soundtrack released to coincide with the video games. These were followed by a nine CD complete set which featured both soundtracks and unreleased tracks. Kingdom Hearts has been adapted as a trading card game by the Tomy corporation of Japan. An English version of the game was released in November 2007 by Fantasy Flight Games. The video games have also been adapted into manga and novel series.

Like the Final Fantasy games, a series of "Ultimania" books were released in Japan for many of the games. These books include game walkthroughs, interviews, and extra information from the developers. Kingdom Hearts -Another Report- was released along with Kingdom Hearts II Final Mix+ and features game information, visuals by Shiro Amano, and a director interview. In North America, Brady Games released strategy guides for each game. For Kingdom Hearts II, they released two versions, a standard version and a limited edition version. The limited edition was available in four different covers and included a copy of Jiminy's Journal along with 400 stickers.

Sora has made guest appearances in other video games, including World of Final Fantasy and Super Smash Bros. Ultimate.

Printed adaptations 
A manga based on the Kingdom Hearts storyline has been released in Japan and the United States. The story and art are done by Shiro Amano, who is also known for his manga adaptation of the Legend of Mana video game. The story follows the events that took place in the video games with differences to account for the loss of interactivity a video game provides. The manga was originally serialized in Japan by Square Enix's Monthly Shōnen Gangan and eventually released in tankōbon format. The first tankōbon was released in Japan in October 2003. The manga was released in the US by Tokyopop two years later in October 2005. Yen Press now holds the rights to publish the books for the USA market. The first series, Kingdom Hearts, consists of four volumes, while the second series, Kingdom Hearts: Chain of Memories, has two volumes. The third series, Kingdom Hearts II, has ten volumes total, taking a hiatus to publish a fourth series based on Kingdom Hearts 358/2 Days which has five volumes total, after which Kingdom Hearts II resumed. As of April 2019, a fifth series based on Kingdom Hearts III has been serialised monthly in Gangan Online with Amano returning to do story and artwork. Yen Press also licensed the series and published it online in English on apps such as Comixology and BookWalker alongside the Japanese release. This series will soon have two volumes published in tankōbon format.

The games have also been adapted as a light novel series, written by Tomoco Kanemaki and illustrated by Shiro Amano. Like the manga series, it is divided into separate series based on the games. Kingdom Hearts is divided into two volumes; "The First Door" and "Darkness Within". Kingdom Hearts: Chain of Memories is divided into two volumes. Kingdom Hearts II is divided into four volumes; "Roxas—Seven Days", "The Destruction of Hollow Bastion", "Tears of Nobody", and "Anthem—Meet Again/Axel Last Stand".

Television series 
A pilot for a television adaptation of the first Kingdom Hearts game was commissioned in 2003 for the Disney Channel, but did not go forward as a series. In October 2022, the pilot's director, Seth Kearsley, uploaded the pilot animatic to his personal YouTube channel and shared more details on the production. The cast of the games reprised their roles for the pilot with the exception of Haley Joel Osment, who was unavailable due to scheduling conflicts and was replaced with Bobby Edner. According to Kearsley, the pilot tested well with their test audiences, but the decision was made not to go further into production due to the franchise's expansion and the difficulty of maintaining consistency with the ongoing game series. The animatic was later taken down by Kearsley at Disney's request.

On May 27, 2020, It was reported that a TV series based on the franchise was in development for Disney+.

Further reading

See also 
 List of Square Enix video game franchises
 List of Japanese role-playing game franchises

Notes

References

External links 

 

 
Action role-playing video games by series
Dark fantasy video games
Hack and slash video games by series
Disney Interactive franchises
Disney Princess
Square Enix franchises
Square Enix
Science fantasy video games
Superhero video games
Video games about parallel universes
Video game franchises introduced in 2002
Video games adapted into comics
Tokyopop titles
Sentient objects in fiction
Yen Press titles
Mickey Mouse video games
Video game franchises
Video games about shapeshifting